Spöland Vännäs IF is a Swedish football club located in Vännäs.

Background
Spöland Vännäs IF  currently plays in Division 3 Mellersta Norrland which is the fifth tier of  Swedish football. They play their home matches at Vännäs IP in Vännäs.

The club is affiliated to Västerbottens Fotbollförbund.

Footnotes

External links
 Spöland Vännäs IF – Official website

Football clubs in Västerbotten County